is the 15th single by Japanese idol girl group AKB48; it was released on February 17, 2010. The title track is a school graduation song. The song was used as the theme song to the AKB48-related drama Majisuka Gakuen, which stars Atsuko Maeda and many members from AKB48 and its sister groups.

In its first week, the song sold 318,000 copies - the biggest opening sales for a female group single since Morning Musume's "Mr. Moonlight (Ai no Big Band)" in July 2001.  The song has been certified platinum for physical sales by the RIAJ.

Composition
The song is composed by Hiroshi Uesugi and written by Yasushi Akimoto.
It is sung with AKB48 members singing together in a school choir. The song is a graduation song, with a theme of cherry blossoms.

Tie-in 
"Sakura no Shiori" was used not only as the theme song for the drama Majisuka Gakuen, but also in commercials for Aoki and Recochoku. The B-side "Majisuka Rock 'n Roll" was used as the opening theme song for the same drama.

Track listing

Personnel

Sakura no Shiori
"Sakura no Shiori" was performed by the following members:

 Team A: Haruna Kojima, Mariko Shinoda, Minami Takahashi, Atsuko Maeda, Miho Miyazaki  
 Team K: Tomomi Itano, Yuko Oshima, Sae Miyazawa 
 Team B: Mayu Watanabe, Rie Kitahara, Yuki Kashiwagi 
 SKE48: Jurina Matsui 

The center for the track was Atsuko Maeda.

Majisuka Rock 'n Roll
The song centred on Atsuko Maeda.

Team A: Haruna Kojima, Mariko Shinoda, Minami Takahashi, Atsuko Maeda.
Team K: Tomomi Itano, Sayaka Akimoto, Erena Ono, Yuko Oshima
Team B: Yuki Kashiwagi, Mayu Watanabe

Enkyori Poster
The unit of girls who sung this song performed under the name "Team Play-Boy." The song centred on Yuki Kashiwagi.

Team A: Aki Takajō, Aika Oota, Ami Maeda
Team K: Sae Miyazawa, Moeno Nito
Team B: Yuki Kashiwagi, Miho Miyazaki

Choose Me!
The unit of girls who sung this song performed under the name "Team Young Jump." The song centred on Rie Kitahara.

Team A: Haruka Nakagawa, Rino Sashihara, Asuka Kuramochi
Team K: Minami Minegishi, Ayaka Kikuchi
Team B: Tomomi Kasai, Rie Kitahara

Chart rankings

Reported sales

References 

Songs about school
AKB48 songs
2010 singles
Songs with lyrics by Yasushi Akimoto
Oricon Weekly number-one singles
Billboard Japan Hot 100 number-one singles
King Records (Japan) singles
2010 songs
Songs about cherry blossom
Japanese television drama theme songs